The 1997 Virginia Cavaliers football team represented the University of Virginia during the 1997 NCAA Division I-A football season. The team's head coach was George Welsh. They played their home games at Scott Stadium in Charlottesville, Virginia.

Schedule

Personnel

References

Virginia
Virginia Cavaliers football seasons
Virginia Cavaliers football